Jeremiah Michael Hogan (6 September 1891 – 21 April 1969) was an Australian rules footballer who played with Richmond in the Victorian Football League (VFL).

Hogan made his debut on Saturday, 26th August, 1911 against Richmond.

Notes

External links 

1891 births
1969 deaths
Australian rules footballers from Victoria (Australia)
Richmond Football Club players